Green chamber may refer to:

 A informal term for lower houses whose decor has been modelled on House of Commons of the United Kingdom (more properly the chamber where it meets), including:
 House of Commons of Canada
 Australian House of Representatives
 Legislative Assembly of Quebec (also nicknamed "green hall")
 One of several organizations styling themselves as green chambers of commerce, including:
 United States Green Chamber of Commerce

See also
 Green room (disambiguation)
 Red chamber (disambiguation)